Gaytime may refer to:

 Golden Gaytime, an Australian ice cream brand
 Gaytime TV , a late-night BBC2 magazine programme
 Gaytime, a comic revue which starred British comedian Reg Varney

See also 
 Gay Times